Eta Piscium (η Piscium, abbreviated Eta Psc, η Psc) is a binary star and the brightest point of light in the constellation of Pisces with an apparent visual magnitude of +3.6. Based upon a measured annual parallax shift of 9.33 mas as seen from Earth, it is located roughly 350 light-years distant from the Sun in the thin disk population of the Milky Way.

The two components are designated Eta Piscium A (formally named Alpherg , the traditional name of the system) and B.

Nomenclature

η Piscium (Latinised to Eta Piscium) is the system's Bayer designation. The designations of the two constituents as Eta Piscium A and B derive from the convention used by the Washington Multiplicity Catalog (WMC) for multiple star systems, and adopted by the International Astronomical Union (IAU).

The system bore the traditional names Al Pherg (in this context meaning the emptying) and Kullat Nunu. At the time that the sun at the March Equinox entered into Pisces having lay in Aries, the system was in the first ecliptic constellation of the Neo-Babylonians, Kullat Nūnu − 'Nūnu' being Babylonian for fish and 'Kullat' referring to either the bucket or the cord that binds the fish. In 2016, the IAU organized a Working Group on Star Names (WGSN) to catalog and standardize proper names for stars. The WGSN decided to attribute proper names to individual stars rather than entire multiple systems. It approved the name Alpherg for the component Eta Piscium A on 1 June 2018 (for its official List).

Properties

At its present distance, the visual magnitude of the system is diminished by an extinction factor of  due to interstellar dust.

This system's binary nature was discovered in 1878 by an amateur astronomer, S. W. Burnham. It has an orbital period of roughly 850 years, a semimajor axis of 1.2 arc seconds, and an eccentricity of 0.47.

The primary, component A, is an evolved, magnitude 3.83 G-type giant star with a stellar classification of G7 IIIa. The companion, component B, is a magnitude 7.51 star.

References

External links

G-type giants
Gamma Cassiopeiae variable stars
Binary stars
Piscium, Eta
Pisces (constellation)
Alpherg
Durchmusterung objects
Piscium, 099
009270
007097
0437